Tonadas may refer to:

 Tonadas (Simón Díaz album), 2003
 Tonadas (Violeta Parra album)
 Tono humano or tonados, secular song, a main genre of 17th-century Spanish and Portuguese music
 Tonada, a folk music style of Latin America